Kielmeyera rubriflora is a species of Kielmeyera from Bolivia to Brazil.

References

External links
 
 

rubriflora
Flora of Brazil